Phalaenopsis × singuliflora is a species of orchid native to Borneo. It is a natural hybrid of Phalaenopsis bellina and Phalaenopsis sumatrana. Its name singuliflora is derived from the consecutively produced flowers.

Taxonomy
It has been viewed as a synonym of Phalaenopsis × gersenii. This natural hybrid however involves Phalaenopsis violacea and Phalaenopsis sumatrana.

References 

singuliflora
Orchid hybrids
Hybrid plants
Plant nothospecies
Interspecific plant hybrids
Plants described in 1932
Orchids of Borneo